Novomoskovsk Raion is a raion (district) of Dnipropetrovsk Oblast, southeastern-central Ukraine. Its administrative centre is located at Novomoskovsk. Population: .

On 18 July 2020, as part of the administrative reform of Ukraine, the number of raions of Dnipropetrovsk Oblast was reduced to seven, and the area of Novomoskovsk Raion was significantly expanded. One abolished raion, Mahdalynivka Raion, as well as the city of Novomoskovsk (which was previously incorporated as a city of oblast significance and did not belong to the raion), were merged into Novomoskovsk Raion. The January 2020 estimate of the raion population was }

Subdivisions

Current
After the reform in July 2020, the raion consisted of eight hromadas:
 Cherkaske settlement hromada with the administration in the urban-type settlement of Cherkaske, retained from Novomoskovsk Raion;
 Chernechchina rural hromada with the administration in the selo of Chernechchina, transferred from Mahdalynivka Raion;
 Hubynykha settlement hromada with the administration in the urban-type settlement of Hubynykha, retained from Novomoskovsk Raion;
 Lychkove rural hromada with the administration in the selo of Lychkove, transferred from Mahdalynivka Raion;
 Mahdalynivka settlement hromada with the administration in the urban-type settlement of Mahdalynivka, transferred from Mahdalynivka Raion.
 Novomoskovsk urban hromada with the administration in the city of Novomoskovsk, transferred from the city of oblast significance of Novomoskovsk;
 Pereshchepyne urban hromada with the administration in the city of Pereshchepyne, retained from Novomoskovsk Raion;
 Pishchanka rural hromada with the administration in the selo  of Pishchanka, retained from Novomoskovsk Raion.

Before 2020

Before the 2020 reform, the raion consisted of four hromadas:
 Cherkaske settlement hromada with the administration in Cherkaske;
 Hubynykha settlement hromada with the administration in Hubynykha;
 Pereshchepyne urban hromada with the administration in Pereshchepyne;
 Pishchanka rural hromada with the administration in Pishchanka.

References

Raions of Dnipropetrovsk Oblast
1923 establishments in Ukraine